Steven Ogden is an Anglican priest in Australia. He was the Dean of Adelaide from 2000 to 2008 when he became head of St Francis Theological College in Brisbane.

References

Deans of Adelaide